Kond Olya (also Romanized as Kond ‘Olyā; also known as Kond-e Bālā and Kand-e Bālā) is a village in Lavasan-e Kuchak Rural District, Lavasanat District, Shemiranat County, Tehran Province, Iran. At the 2006 census, its population was 655, in 187 families.

References 

Populated places in Shemiranat County